This is a list of yearly Pioneer Football League standings.

Pioneer League standings

References

Pioneer Football League
Standings